The 2006–07 Illinois State Redbirds men's basketball team represented Illinois State University during the 2006–07 NCAA Division I men's basketball season. The Redbirds, led by fourth year head coach Porter Moser, played their home games at Redbird Arena and competed as a member of the Missouri Valley Conference.

They finished the season 15–16, 6–12 in conference play to finish in a tie for seventh place. They were the number seven seed for the 2007 Missouri Valley Conference men's basketball tournament. They were defeated by Indiana State University in their opening round game.

Roster

Schedule

|-
!colspan=9 style=|Exhibition Season

|-
!colspan=9 style=|Regular Season

|-
!colspan=9 style=|State FarmMissouri Valley Conference {MVC} tournament

References

Illinois State Redbirds men's basketball seasons
Illinois State
Illinois State Redbirds Men's
Illinois State Redbirds Men's